The Russell Glacier is a medium-sized glacier on the north flank of Mount Rainier, Washington. Echo Rock and  Observation Rock, two minor sub-peaks of Rainier, lie northwest of this glacier. Meltwater from the glacier eventually reaches the Carbon River.

See also
List of glaciers

References

Glaciers of Mount Rainier
Glaciers of Washington (state)